13 Fighting Men is a 1960 American drama film directed by Harry W. Gerstad and written by Robert Hamner and Jack W. Thomas. The film stars Grant Williams, Brad Dexter, Carole Mathews, Robert Dix, Richard Garland and Richard Crane.

The film was released in April 1960 by 20th Century Fox.

Plot
Though the War Between The States has officially ended, a group of Confederate soldiers continues to fight for their own cause, laying siege to a small group of Union soldiers holed up in a farmhouse who are guarding a substantial amount of gold coins for a federal agent. The story comes off okay in this noticeably low-budget effort thanks to all the personalities this film features. The presence of all that gold seems to affect all of them in interesting ways. The farm owner is a Union army vet who converted to pacifism after experiencing the war, while his wife is trying to attract the Union commander who is trying to protect the gold from both his men and the Confederates, who include some strange characters, one of which is Ted Knight.

Cast 
Grant Williams as Capt. John Forrest
Brad Dexter as Maj. Simon Boyd
Carole Mathews as Carole Prescott
Robert Dix as Lt. Wilcox
Richard Garland as Capt. John Prescott
Richard Crane as Loomis
Rayford Barnes as Sgt. Yates
Rex Holman as Root
John Erwin as Cpl. McLean
Boyd Holister as Pvt. Jensen
Mauritz Hugo as Walter Ives
Richard Monahan
Ted Knight as Samuel
Fred Kohler Jr. as Corey
Stephen Ferry as Sgt. Wade
I. Stanford Jolley as Pvt. Ebb
Walter Reed as Col. Jeffers
John Frederick as Lee
Mark Hickman as Sgt. Mason
Ford Dunhill as Pvt. Harper
Brad Harris as Pvt. Fowler
Earl Holmes as Confederate Soldier
Richard Jeffries as Jimmy
Jerry Mobley as Sentry

Production
The film was announced in September 1959. Filming started in December.

Reception 
The New York Daily News awarded 13 Fighting Men two and a half stars, calling it "... a cut above the average Civil War story ... There is suspense and melodrama. ... Performances are surprisingly good."

References

External links 
 

1960 films
1960s English-language films
20th Century Fox films
CinemaScope films
American drama films
1960 drama films
Revisionist Western (genre) films
1960s American films